Tromba is a 1949 Italian-West German thriller film directed by Helmut Weiss and starring René Deltgen, Angelika Hauff and Gustav Knuth. It is a circus film with elements of film noir. It was one of the most popular West German films of the year, suggesting audiences supported a shift away from rubble films. It was made at the Bavaria Studios in Munich with sets designed by the art director Ernst H. Albrecht. It was released in the US in 1952 as Tromba: the Tiger Man by Lippert Pictures.

Cast
 René Deltgen as Kurt Tromba, Tigerdompteur
 Angelika Hauff as Ola Orlando, Trapezkünstlerin
 Gustav Knuth as Ernesto Spadoli, Artist
 Hilde Weissner as Teresa Kronbeck, Zirkusdirektorin
 Gardy Granass as Gardy Kronbeck, Sportstudentin
 Grethe Weiser as Cläre Vets, ehemalige Schulreiterin
 Adrian Hoven as Rudy Walheim, Sportstudent
 Carl Wery as Eric Jensen, Zirkusregisseur
 Hans Böhme as Olaf Orlando, Artist
 Dieter von der Recke as Alfons Orlando, Artist
 Jürgen Richter as Andy Orlando

References

Bibliography

External links 
 

1949 films
1940s thriller films
German thriller films
West German films
1940s German-language films
Films directed by Helmut Weiss
Circus films
Films about hypnosis
Films about tigers
German black-and-white films
Lippert Pictures films
Italian thriller films
1940s German films
1940s Italian films
Films shot at Bavaria Studios